George Edward Carroll (June 3, 1897 in Moncton, New Brunswick – August 5, 1939) was a Canadian professional ice hockey defenceman who played 16 games in the National Hockey League for the Montreal Maroons and Boston Bruins during the 1924–25 season. The rest of his career, which lasted from 1919 to 1925, was spent in senior leagues.

Career statistics

Regular season and playoffs

External links
 

1897 births
1939 deaths
Boston Bruins players
Canadian ice hockey defencemen
Ice hockey people from New Brunswick
Montreal Maroons players
Sportspeople from Moncton